AERA or Aera may refer to:

 Aera (magazine), a Japanese weekly magazine
 Aera Energy, an American oil company
 American Educational Research Association, a professional research organization
 American Equal Rights Association, a social equality organization that existed during the 1860s
 Ancient Egypt Research Associates, a non-profit organization founded by Mark Lehner

See also
 Era
 ERA (disambiguation)